Cătălin Drulă (born 2 May 1981) is a Romanian politician who currently serves as the president of the Save Romania Union (USR) political party in Romania (officially since 10 July 2022 onwards and previously acting/ad interim for  5 months before), and as an incumbent MP, more specifically a current member of the Romanian Chamber of Deputies, elected as a deputy for Timiș County, on 6 December 2020 at the 2020 Romanian legislative election. 

From 23 December 2020, he served as the Minister of Transport in the Cîțu Cabinet, until his resignation registered on 7 September 2021. According to USR MP Emanuel Ungureanu, he could likely be the presidential candidate of USR for the forthcoming 2024 Romanian presidential election.

Since 7 February 2022 onwards, he has been serving as the ad interim president of the USR, as a result of the resignation of Dacian Cioloș.

References 

Living people
1981 births
Politicians from Bucharest
21st-century Romanian politicians
Romanian Ministers of Transport
University of Toronto alumni